Tony Reedus (22 September 1959 – 16 November 2008) was an American jazz drummer.

Reedus first gained attention performing in Woody Shaw's band during the 1980s. He played with Dave Stryker, Mulgrew Miller, Art Blakey, Mike Nock, Kenny Garrett, James Williams, and Anthony Wonsey, among others, and recorded three albums as a leader.

He died of a pulmonary embolism at Kennedy Airport at the age of 49. He had just returned from a tour in Italy with pianist Mike LeDonne.

Discography

As leader
 The Far Side (Jazz City, 1988)
 Incognito (Enja, 1989)
 Minor Thang (Criss Cross, 1996)
 People Get Ready (Sweet Basil, 1998)

As sideman
With Joanne Brackeen
Power Talk (Turnipseed, 1994)
With Robin Eubanks & Steve Turre
 Dedication (JMT, 1989)
With Kenny Garrett
 Introducing Kenny Garrett (Criss Cross 1985)
 Garrett 5 (Bellaphon 1989)
 African Exchange Student (Atlantic Jazz 1990)
With Benny Golson
Benny Golson Quartet Live (Dreyfus, 1989 [1991])
Benny Golson Quartet (LRC Ltd. 1990)
Domingo (Dreyfus, 1992)
I Remember Miles (Alfa Jazz, 1993)
With Benny Green
 Prelude (Criss Cross, 1988)
With Geoff Keezer
Waiting in the Wings (Sunnyside, 1989)
 With Our Own Eyes (Novus, 1993)
With Harold Mabern
Mabern's Grooveyard (DIW, 1996)
 Maya with Love (DIW, 2000)
With Ronnie Mathews
Selena's Dance (Timeless, 1988)
With Mulgrew Miller
 Wingspan (Landmark, 1987)
 Time and Again (Landmark, 1991)
With Dick Oatts
 Gratitude (Steeplechase 2007)
With Woody Shaw
 United (Columbia, 1981)
 Lotus Flower (Enja, 1982)
 Master of the Art (Elektra Musicia, 1982)
 Night Music (Elektra Musicia, 1982)
 The Time Is Right (Red, 1983)
With Jim Snidero
Tippin' (Savant, 2007)
With James Spaulding
The Smile of the Snake (HighNote, 1997)
With Walt Weiskopf Quintet
 Anytown (Criss Cross Jazz, 1998)
With Anthony Wonsey
 Blues for Hiroshi (Sharp Nine, 2004)

References

Ron Wynn, [ Tony Reedus] at Allmusic

1959 births
2008 deaths
American jazz drummers
Chesky Records artists
Enja Records artists
20th-century American drummers
American male drummers
20th-century American male musicians
American male jazz musicians